Health Net Pro Cycling Team Presented by Maxxis (UCI identifier: HNM) was run by Momentum Sports Group and based in the United States.

Health Net won the team title in the 2004, 2005, 2006 and 2007 USA Cycling National Racing Calendar series competition. In 2007, Rory Sutherland captured the individual championship on the USA Cycling National Racing Calendar.

Health Net was one of nine UCI Professional Continental Teams to compete in the 2006 Tour de Georgia.  In 2005 representing Health Net, Greg Henderson won the points competition in the Tour de Georgia and the International Tour de Toona. Scott Moninger and John Lieswyn have won the International Tour de Toona for Health Net in 2005 and 2004, respectively.

Team members

2008 team

2007 team

2006 team

2005 team

References

External links 
 Health Net Pro Cycling Team Presented by Maxxis

Cycle racing in the United States
2005 road cycling season by team
2006 road cycling season by team
2007 road cycling season by team
2008 road cycling season by team
2005 in American sports
2006 in American sports
2007 in American sports
2008 in American sports